Chlorhoda albolimbata, the flashing footman, is a moth of the subfamily Arctiinae. The species was first described by Hervé de Toulgoët and David T. Goodger in 1985 and it is found in Peru.

References

Arctiini